Ghana, officially the Republic of Ghana, is a country in West Africa. It abuts the Gulf of Guinea and the Atlantic Ocean to the south, sharing borders with Ivory Coast in the west, Burkina Faso in the north, and Togo in the east. With over 32 million inhabitants, Ghana is the second-most populous country in West Africa, after Nigeria. The capital and largest city is Accra; other major cities are Kumasi, Tamale, and Sekondi-Takoradi.

The first permanent state in present-day Ghana was the Bono state of the 11th century. Numerous kingdoms and empires emerged over the centuries, of which the most powerful were the Kingdom of Dagbon in the north and the Ashanti Empire in the south. Beginning in the 15th century, the Portuguese Empire, followed by numerous other European powers, contested the area for trading rights, until the British ultimately established control of the coast by the late 19th century. Following over a century of colonisation, Ghana's current borders took shape, encompassing four separate British colonial territories: Gold Coast, Ashanti, the Northern Territories, and British Togoland. These were unified as an independent dominion within the Commonwealth of Nations on 6 March 1957, becoming the first colony in West Africa to achieve sovereignty. Ghana subsequently became influential in decolonisation efforts and the Pan-African movement.

Ghana is a multi-ethnic country with a diverse population, linguistic and religious groups; while the Akan are the largest ethnic group, they constitute only a plurality. Most Ghanaians are Christians (71.3%); almost a fifth are Muslims; a tenth practise traditional faiths or report no religion. Ghana is a unitary constitutional democracy led by a president who is both head of state and head of government. Ghana has maintained since 1993 one of the freest and most stable governments on the continent, and it performs relatively well in healthcare, economic growth, and human development, so that it has a significant influence in West Africa and Africa as a whole and is highly integrated in international affairs, being a founding member of the Non-Aligned Movement, African Union and a member of the Economic Community of West African States, Group of 24 and Commonwealth of Nations.

Etymology
Ghana means "strong warrior king" and was the title accorded to the kings of the medieval Ghana Empire in West Africa—not to be confused with today's Ghana, for the empire was further north, in modern-day Mali, Senegal and southern Mauritania, as well as in the region of Guinea. Ghana was known for its large gold usage and hence was named the Land of Gold.

History

Medieval kingdoms

Most of what is now Ghana was inhabited in the Middle Ages and the Age of Discovery by different ethnic groups. The earliest known kingdoms to emerge in modern Ghana were the Mole-Dagbani states. The Mole-Dagomba came on horseback from present-day Burkina Faso under a single leader, Naa Gbewaa. With their advanced weapons and based on a central authority, they easily invaded and occupied the lands of the local people ruled by the tendamba (land god priests), established themselves as the rulers over the locals, and made Gambaga their capital. The death of Naa Gbewaa caused seccession among his children, some of whom broke off and founded separate states including Mamprugu and Nanung. While Gbewaa was still alive, his daughter Yennenga travelled north and founded the Mossi Kingdoms, who constitute the majority of present day Burkina Faso. Other kingdoms that emerged from Dagbon include the Bouna Kingdom of Ivory Coast, and the Dagaaba states of the Upper West Region.

Although the area of present-day Ghana has experienced many population movements, the Akan-speaking peoples began to move into it toward the end of the 15th century. By the early 16th century, the Akans were firmly established in the Akan state called Bonoman, for which the Brong-Ahafo region was named. From the 17th century, Akans emerged from what is believed to have been the Bonoman area, to create several Akan states, mainly based on gold trading. These states included Bonoman (Brong-Ahafo region), Ashanti (Ashanti Region), Denkyira (Western North region), Mankessim Kingdom (Central region), and Akwamu (Eastern region). By the 19th century, the territory of the southern part of Ghana was included in the Kingdom of Ashanti, one of the influential states in sub-Saharan Africa prior to the onset of colonialism. The government of the Ashanti Empire operated first as a loose network and eventually as a centralised kingdom with an advanced, highly specialised bureaucracy centred in the capital city of Kumasi. Prior to Akan contact with Europeans, the Akan people created an advanced economy based on principally gold and gold bar commodities then traded with the states of Africa.

The Ga-Dangme and Ewe migrated westward from south-western Nigeria because of pressure from incessant tribal wars.The Ewe migrated with their Gbe-speaking kinsmen and in transition,settled in Ketou in Benin Republic, Tado in Togo and with Nortsie in Togo as their final dispersal point. Their dispersal from Nortsie was necessitated by the high handed rule of King Agorkorli (Agor Akorlie). The Ga- Dangme occupy the Greater Accra Region and parts of the Eastern Region, while the Ewe are found in the Volta Region as well as the neighbouring Togo, Benin Republic and Nigeria ( around Badagry area).

European contact and colonialism

Akan trade with European states began after contact with the Portuguese in the 15th century. Early European contact by the Portuguese people, who came to the Gold Coast region in the 15th century to trade and then established the Portuguese Gold Coast (Costa do Ouro), focused on the extensive availability of gold. The Portuguese built a trading lodge at a coastal settlement called Anomansah (the perpetual drink) which they renamed São Jorge da Mina. In 1481, King John II of Portugal commissioned Diogo de Azambuja to build the Elmina Castle, which was completed in three years. By 1598, the Dutch had joined the Portuguese in the gold trade, establishing the Dutch Gold Coast (Nederlandse Bezittingen ter Kuste van Guinea) and building forts at Fort Komenda and Kormantsi. In 1617, the Dutch captured the Elmina Castle from the Portuguese and Axim in 1642 (Fort St Anthony).

Other European traders had joined in gold trading by the mid-17th century, most notably the Swedes, establishing the Swedish Gold Coast (Svenska Guldkusten), and Denmark–Norway, establishing the Danish Gold Coast (Danske Guldkyst or Dansk Guinea). In addition to the gold trade, European traders participated in the Atlantic slave trade in this area. More than 30 forts and castles were built by the merchants. The Germans also established the Brandenburger Gold Coast or Groß Friedrichsburg). In 1874, Great Britain established control over some parts of the country, assigning these areas the status of the British Gold Coast. Many military engagements occurred between the British colonial powers and the various Akan nation-states. The Kingdom of Ashanti defeated the British a few times in the 100-year-long Anglo-Ashanti wars but eventually lost with the War of the Golden Stool in 1900.

Transition to independence

In 1947, the newly formed United Gold Coast Convention led by "The Big Six" called for "self-government within the shortest possible time" following the 1946 Gold Coast legislative election. Kwame Nkrumah, a Ghanaian nationalist who led Ghana from 1957 to 1966 as the country's first prime minister and president, formed the Convention People's Party in 1949 with the motto "self-government now". The party initiated a "positive action" campaign involving non-violent protests, strikes and non-cooperation with the British authorities. Nkrumah was arrested and sentenced to one year imprisonment during this time. In the Gold Coast's 1951 general election, he was elected to Parliament and released from prison to become leader of government business. He became the prime minister in 1952. He improved the infrastructure of the country, and his Africanisation policies created better career opportunities for Ghanaians.

On 6 March 1957 at midnight, the Gold Coast, Ashanti, the Northern Territories, and British Togoland were unified as one single independent dominion within the British Commonwealth under the name Ghana. This was done under the Ghana Independence Act 1957. The current flag of Ghana, consisting of the colours red, gold, green, and a black star, dates back to this unification. It was designed by Theodosia Okoh; the red represents the blood that was shed towards independence; the gold represents the industrial minerals wealth of Ghana; the green symbolises the rich grasslands of Ghana, and the black star is the symbol of the Ghanaian people and African emancipation.

On 1 July 1960, following the Ghanaian constitutional referendum and Ghanaian presidential election, Nkrumah declared Ghana a republic and assumed the presidency. 6 March is the nation's Independence Day, and 1 July is celebrated as Republic Day. At the time of independence Nkrumah declared, "My first objective is to abolish from Ghana poverty, ignorance, and disease. We shall measure our progress by the improvement in the health of our people; by the number of children in school, and by the quality of their education; by the availability of water and electricity in our towns and villages; and by the happiness which our people take in being able to manage their own affairs. The welfare of our people is our chief pride, and it is by this that my government will ask to be judged.".

Nkrumah led an authoritarian regime in Ghana, as he repressed political opposition and conducted elections that were not free and fair. In 1964, a constitutional amendment made Ghana a one-party state, with Nkrumah as president for life of both the nation and its party.

Nkrumah was the first African head of state to promote the concept of Pan-Africanism, which he had been introduced to during his studies at Lincoln University, Pennsylvania in the United States, at the time when Marcus Garvey was popular for his "Back to Africa Movement". Nkrumah merged the teachings of Garvey, Martin Luther King Jr. and the naturalised Ghanaian scholar W. E. B. Du Bois into the formation of 1960s Ghana. Osagyefo Dr. Kwame Nkrumah, as he became known, played an instrumental part in the founding of the Non-Aligned Movement, and in establishing the Kwame Nkrumah Ideological Institute to teach his ideologies of communism and socialism. His life achievements were recognised by Ghanaians during his centenary birthday celebration, and the day was instituted as a public holiday in Ghana (Founders' Day).

Operation Cold Chop and aftermath

The government of Nkrumah was subsequently overthrown by a coup by the Ghana Armed Forces codenamed "Operation Cold Chop". This occurred while Nkrumah was abroad with Zhou Enlai in the People's Republic of China, on a fruitless mission to Hanoi in Vietnam to help end the Vietnam War. The coup took place on 24 February 1966, led by Colonel Emmanuel Kwasi Kotoka and Brigadier Akwasi Afrifa. The National Liberation Council was formed, chaired by Lieutenant General Joseph A. Ankrah.

A series of alternating military and civilian governments, often affected by economic instabilities, ruled Ghana from 1966 to 1981, ending with the ascension to power of Flight Lieutenant Jerry John Rawlings of the Provisional National Defence Council in 1981. These changes resulted in the suspension of the Constitution of Ghana in 1981 and the banning of political parties. The economy soon declined, so Rawlings negotiated a structural adjustment plan, changing many old economic policies, and economic growth recovered during the mid-1980s. A new constitution restoring multi-party system politics was promulgated in the presidential election of 1992; Rawlings was elected as president of Ghana then, and again in the general election of 1996.

At least 1,000 and as many as 2,000 people were killed during the conflict between the Konkomba and other ethnic groups such as the Nanumba, Dagomba and Gonja, while 150,000 people were displaced as part of the tribal war in Northern Ghana in 1994.

21st century

Winning the 2000 general election, John Kufuor of the New Patriotic Party was sworn into office as president of Ghana on 7 January 2001 and attained the presidency again in the 2004 election, thus also serving two terms (the term limit) as president of Ghana and thus marking the first time under the fourth republic that power was transferred from one legitimately elected head of state and head of government to another.

Nana Akufo-Addo, the ruling party candidate, was defeated in a very close election by John Atta Mills of the National Democratic Congress following the 2008 general election. Mills died of natural causes and was succeeded by Vice President John Mahama on 24 July 2012. Following the 2012 general election, Mahama became president, and Ghana was a stable democracy. As a result of the 2016 general election, Nana Akufo-Addo became president on 7 January 2017. He was re-elected after a tightly contested election in 2020.

On 11 June 2021, Ghana inaugurated Green Ghana Day in an aim of planting 5 million trees in a concentrating effort to preserve the country's cover of rainforest to combat deforestation.

Geography

Ghana is located on the Gulf of Guinea, only a few degrees north of the Equator, therefore giving it a warm climate. Dodi Island and Bobowasi Island are near the south coast. It lies between latitudes 4°45'N and 11°N, and longitudes 1°15'E and 3°15'W. The prime meridian passes through Ghana, specifically through Tema.

Ghana is home to five terrestrial ecoregions: Eastern Guinean forests, Guinean forest–savanna mosaic, West Sudanian savanna, Central African mangroves, and Guinean mangroves. It had a 2018 Forest Landscape Integrity Index mean score of 4.53/10, ranking it 112th globally out of 172 countries.

The White Volta River and its tributary Black Volta, flow south through Ghana to Lake Volta, the world's third-largest reservoir by volume and largest by surface area, formed by the hydroelectric Akosombo Dam, completed in 1965. The Volta flows out of Lake Volta into the Gulf of Guinea. The northernmost part of Ghana is Pulmakong and the southernmost part of Ghana is Cape Three Points.

Volta Region: Longest mountain range in Ghana-Akwapim Togo ranges

Mt Afadja- highest mountain in Ghana

Wli waterfall- the highest waterfall in Ghana

Amedzofe- Mt Gemi- waterfall and canopy walk.

Golden sandy beaches stretching from Anyanui to Aflao

Aflao: the eastern gateway to Ghana and bordering Lome, the Togolese capital

Keta- Fort Prizenstein, the former Danish slave trading post. Site of proposed Keta Port. The town with the most promising and expanding tourism potential in Ghana

Climate

The climate of Ghana is tropical, and there are two main seasons: the wet season and the dry season. Ghana sits at the intersection of three hydro-climatic zones. Changes in rainfall, weather conditions and sea-level rise affect the salinity of coastal waters. This is expected to negatively affect both farming and fisheries. The national economy stands to suffer from the impacts of climate change because of its dependence on climate-sensitive sectors such as agriculture, energy, and forestry. Moreover, access to fresh water is expected to become more challenging, and reduced water supply will have a negative impact on hydropower, which provides 54% of the country's electricity capacity. Additionally, Ghana will probably see more cases of malaria and cholera, since both are impacted by changes in water conditions.

In 2015, the government produced a document titled "Ghana's Intended Nationally Determined Contribution." Following that, Ghana signed the Paris Climate Agreement in 2016.

Politics

Ghana is a unitary presidential constitutional democracy with a parliamentary multi-party system that is dominated by two parties—the National Democratic Congress (NDC) and the New Patriotic Party (NPP). Ghana alternated between civilian and military governments until January 1993, when the military government gave way to the Fourth Republic of Ghana after presidential and parliamentary elections in late 1992. The 1992 constitution of Ghana divides powers among a commander-in-chief of the Ghana Armed Forces (President of Ghana), parliament (Parliament of Ghana), cabinet (Cabinet of Ghana), council of state (Ghanaian Council of State), and an independent judiciary (Judiciary of Ghana). The government is elected by universal suffrage after every four years.

Nana Akufo-Addo won the presidency in the general election in 2016, defeating incumbent John Mahama. He also won the 2020 election after the presidential election results were challenged at the Supreme Court by flagbearer of the NDC, John Mahama. Presidents are limited to two four-year terms in office. The president can serve a second term only upon re-election.

The 2012 Fragile States Index indicated that Ghana is ranked the 67th-least fragile state in the world and the fifth-least fragile state in Africa. Ghana ranked 112th out of 177 countries on the index. Ghana ranked as the 64th-least corrupt and politically corrupt country in the world out of all 174 countries ranked and ranked as the fifth-least corrupt and politically corrupt country in Africa out of 53 countries in the 2012 Transparency International Corruption Perception Index. Ghana was ranked 7th in Africa out of 53 countries in the 2012 Ibrahim Index of African Governance. The Ibrahim Index is a comprehensive measure of African government, based on variables which reflect the success with which governments deliver essential political goods to its citizens.

Foreign relations

Since independence, Ghana has been devoted to ideals of nonalignment and is a founding member of the Non-Aligned Movement. Ghana favours international and regional political and economic co-operation, and is an active member of the United Nations and the African Union.

Ghana has a strong relationship with the United States. Three recent U.S. presidents—Bill Clinton, George W. Bush, and Barack Obama—made diplomatic trips to Ghana. Many Ghanaian diplomats and politicians hold positions in international organisations, including Ghanaian diplomat and former Secretary-General of the United Nations Kofi Annan, International Criminal Court Judge Akua Kuenyehia, as well as former President Jerry John Rawlings and former President John Agyekum Kufuor, who both served as diplomats of the United Nations.

In September 2010, President John Atta Mills visited China on an official visit. Mills and China's former President Hu Jintao marked the 50th anniversary of diplomatic ties between the two nations, at the Great Hall of the People. China reciprocated with an official visit in November 2011, by the vice-chairman of the Standing Committee of the National People's Congress of China, Zhou Tienong who visited Ghana and met with Ghana's President John Mahama. Iranian President Mahmoud Ahmadinejad met with Mahama in 2013 to hold discussions on strengthening the Non-Aligned Movement and also co–chair a bilateral meeting between Ghana and Iran at the Ghanaian presidential palace Flagstaff House.

The Sustainable Development Goals (SDG) were integrated into Ghana's development agenda and the budget. According to reports, the SDGs were implemented through a decentralized planning approach. This allows stakeholders' participations such as UN agencies, traditional leaders, civil society organizations, academia, and others. The 17 SDGs are a global call to action to end poverty among others, and the UN and its partners in the country are working towards achieving them. According to the President Nana Akufo-Addo, Ghana was "the first sub-Saharan African country to achieve the goal of halving poverty, as contained in Goal 1 of the Millennium Development Goals"

Military

In 1957, the Ghana Armed Forces (GAF) consisted of its headquarters, support services, three battalions of infantry and a reconnaissance squadron with armoured vehicles. President Nkrumah aimed at rapidly expanding the GAF to support the United States of Africa ambitions. Thus, in 1961, 4th and 5th Battalions were established, and in 1964 6th Battalion was established, from a parachute airborne unit originally raised in 1963. Today, Ghana is a regional power and regional hegemon. In his book Shake Hands with the Devil, Canadian Forces commander Roméo Dallaire highly rated the GAF soldiers and military personnel.

The military operations and military doctrine of the GAF are conceptualised in the constitution, Ghana's Law on Armed Force Military Strategy, and Kofi Annan International Peacekeeping Training Centre agreements to which GAF is attestator. GAF military operations are executed under the auspices and imperium of the Ministry of Defence. Although Ghana is relatively peaceful and is often considered being one of the least violent countries in the region, Ghana has experienced political violence in the past and 2017 has thus far seen an upward trend in incidents motivated by political grievances.

Law enforcement

The Ghana Police Service and the Criminal Investigation Department are the main law enforcement agencies, responsible for the detection of crime, maintenance of law and order and the maintenance of internal peace and security. The Ghana Police Service has eleven specialised police units, including a Militarized police Rapid deployment force and Marine Police Unit. The Ghana Police Service operates in 12 divisions: ten covering the regions of Ghana, one assigned specifically to the seaport and industrial hub of Tema, and the twelfth being the Railways, Ports and Harbours Division. The Ghana Police Service's Marine Police Unit and Division handles issues that arise from the country's offshore oil and gas industry.

The Ghana Prisons Service and the sub-division Borstal Institute for Juveniles administers incarceration. Ghana retains and exercises the death penalty for treason, corruption, robbery, piracy, drug trafficking, rape, and homicide. The new sustainable development goals adopted by the United Nations call for the international community to come together to promote the rule of law; support equal access to justice for all; reduce corruption; and develop effective, accountable, and transparent institutions at all levels.

Ghana is used as a key narcotics industry transshipment point by traffickers, usually from South America as well as some from other African nations. In 2013, the UN chief of the Office on Drugs and Crime stated that "West Africa is completely weak in terms of border control and the big drug cartels from Colombia and Latin America have chosen Africa as a way to reach Europe." There is not a wide or popular knowledge about the narcotics industry and intercepted narcotics within Ghana, since it is an underground economy. The social context within which narcotic trafficking, storage, transportation, and repacking systems exist in Ghana and the state's location along the Gulf of Guinea makes Ghana an attractive country for the narcotics business. The Narcotics Control Board has impounded container ships at the Sekondi Naval Base in the Takoradi Harbour. These ships were carrying thousands of kilograms of cocaine, with a street value running into billions of Ghana cedis. However, drug seizures saw a decline in 2011. Drug cartels are using new methods in narcotics production and narcotics exportation, to avoid Ghanaian security agencies. Underdeveloped institutions, porous open borders, and the existence of established smuggling organisations contribute to Ghana's position in the narcotics industry. President Mills initiated ongoing efforts to reduce the role of airports in Ghana's drug trade.

Human rights 

Homosexual acts are prohibited by law in Ghana. According to a 2013 survey by the Pew Research Center, 96% of Ghanaians believe that homosexuality should not be accepted by society. Sometimes elderly women in Ghana are accused of witchcraft, particularly in rural Ghana. Issues of witchcraft mainly remain as speculations based on superstitions within families. In some parts of northern Ghana, there exist what are called witch camps. This is said to house a total of around 1,000 people accused of witchcraft. The Ghanaian government has announced that it intends to close the camps.

Administrative divisions 

Ghana is divided into 16 administrative regions, sub-divided into 275 districts:

Economy

Key sectors

Ghana is an average natural resource enriched country possessing industrial minerals, hydrocarbons and precious metals. It is an emerging designated digital economy with mixed economy hybridisation and an emerging market. It has an economic plan target known as the "Ghana Vision 2020". This plan envisions Ghana as the first African country to become a developed country between 2020 and 2029 and a newly industrialised country between 2030 and 2039. This excludes fellow Group of 24 member and Sub-Saharan African country South Africa, which is a newly industrialised country.

Ghana's economy has ties to the Chinese yuan renminbi along with Ghana's vast gold reserves. In 2013, the Bank of Ghana began circulating the renminbi throughout Ghanaian state-owned banks and to the Ghana public as hard currency along with the national Ghanaian cedi for second national trade currency.

Between 2012 and 2013, 38% of rural dwellers were experiencing poverty whereas only 11% of urban dwellers were. Urban areas hold greater opportunity for employment, particularly in informal trade, while nearly all (94 percent) of rural poor households participate in the agricultural sector.

The Volta River Authority and the Ghana National Petroleum Corporation, both state-owned, are the two major electricity producers. The Akosombo Dam, built on the Volta River in 1965, along with the Bui Dam, the Kpong Dam and several other hydroelectric dams, provide hydropower. In addition, the government sought to build the second nuclear power plant in Africa.

The Ghana Stock Exchange is the 5th largest on continental Africa and 3rd largest in sub-saharan Africa with a market capitalisation of GH¢ 57.2 billion or CN¥180.4 billion in 2012 with the South Africa JSE Limited as first. The Ghana Stock Exchange was the 2nd best performing stock exchange in sub-saharan Africa in 2013.

Ghana produces high-quality cocoa. It is the 2nd largest producer of cocoa globally. Ghana is classified as a middle income country. Services account for 50% of GDP, followed by manufacturing (24.1%), extractive industries (5%), and taxes (20.9%). Ghana has an increasing primary manufacturing economy and export of digital technology goods along with assembling and exporting automobiles and ships, diverse resource rich exportation of industrial minerals, agricultural products primarily cocoa, petroleum and natural gas, and industries such as information and communications technology primarily via Ghana's state digital technology corporation Rlg Communications which manufactures tablet computers with smartphones and various consumer electronics. Urban electric cars have been manufactured in Ghana since 2014.

Ghana announced plans to issue government debt by way of social and green bonds in Autumn 2021, making it the first African country to do so. The country, which is planning to borrow up to $5 billion in international markets this year, would use the proceeds from these sustainable bonds to refinance debt used for social and environmental projects and pay for educational or health. Only a few other nations have sold them so far, including Chile and Ecuador. The country will use the proceeds to forge ahead with a free secondary-school initiative started in 2017 among other programs, despite having recorded its lowest economic growth rate in 37 years in 2020.

Petroleum and natural gas production

Ghana produces and exports an abundance of hydrocarbons such as sweet crude oil and natural gas. The 100%-state-owned filling station company of Ghana, Ghana Oil Company, is the number 1 petroleum and gas filling station of Ghana, and the 100%-state-owned state oil company Ghana National Petroleum Corporation oversees hydrocarbon exploration and production of Ghana's entire petroleum and natural gas reserves.

Oil and gas exploration off Ghana's eastern coast on the Gulf of Guinea is ongoing, and the amount of both crude oil and natural gas continues to increase. The government has drawn up plans to nationalise Ghana's entire petroleum and natural gas reserves to increase government revenue.

Industrial minerals mining

As of 2019, Ghana was the 7th largest producer of gold in the world, producing ~140 tonnes that year. This record saw Ghana surpass South Africa in output for the first time, making Ghana the largest gold producer in Africa. In addition to gold, Ghana also exports silver, timber, diamonds, bauxite, and manganese, and has numerous other not-yet-fully exploited mineral deposits. Ghana ranks 9th in the world in both diamond export and reserve size. The government has drawn up plans to nationalize Ghana's mining industry to increase government revenue.

Electricity generation

Severe shortages of electricity in 2015 & 2016 led to dumsor (persistent, irregular and unpredictable electric power outages), increasing the interest in renewables. As of 2019, there is now a surplus of electricity which now presents a new set of financial challenges.

Economic transparency
The judicial system of Ghana deals with corruption, economic malpractice and lack of economic transparency. Despite significant economic progress, obstacles do remain. Particular institutions need reform, and property rights need improvement. The overall investment regime lacks market transparency. Tackling these issues will be necessary if Ghana's rapid economic growth is to be maintained. According to Transparency International's Corruption Perception Index of 2018, out of 180 countries, Ghana was ranked 78th, with a score of 41 on a scale where a 0–9 score means highly corrupt, and a 90–100 score means very clean. This was based on perceived levels of public sector corruption.

Science and technology
Ghana was the first sub-Saharan African country to launch a cellular mobile network (1992). It was one of the first countries in Africa to be connected to the internet and to introduce ADSL broadband services. Ghana was ranked 112nd in the Global Innovation Index in 2021, down from 106th in 2019.

Space and satellite programmes
The Ghana Space Science and Technology Centre (GSSTC) and Ghana Space Agency (GhsA) oversee the space exploration and space programmes of Ghana. GSSTC and GhsA worked to have a national security observational satellite launched into orbit in 2015. Ghana's annual space exploration expenditure has been 1% of its GDP, to support research in science and technology. In 2012, Ghana was elected to chair the Commission on Science and Technology for Sustainable Development in the South (Comsats); Ghana has a joint effort in space exploration with the South African National Space Agency.

Tourism

In 2011, 1,087,000 tourists visited Ghana. Tourist arrivals include South Americans, Asians, Europeans, and North Americans. The attractions and major tourist destinations include a warm, tropical climate year-round, diverse wildlife, waterfalls such as Kintampo waterfalls and the largest waterfall in west Africa, Wli waterfalls, the coastal palm-lined sandy beaches, caves, mountains, rivers, and reservoirs and lakes such as Lake Bosumtwi and the largest man-made lake in the world by surface area, Lake Volta, dozens of forts and castles, World Heritage Sites, nature reserves and national parks. In addition to the beautiful natural reserves which serve as tourist sites, there are some castles that attract many tourists from all over the world. Some of the notable castles are Cape Coast Castle and the Elmina Castle. Not only are the castles important for tourism, they also mark where blood was shed in the slave trade and preserve and promote the African heritage stolen and destroyed through the slave trade. As a result of this, the World Heritage Convention of UNESCO named Ghana's castles and forts as World Heritage Monuments.

The World Economic Forum statistics in 2010 showed that out of the world's favourite tourist destinations, Ghana was ranked 108th out of 139 countries. The country had moved two places up from the 2009 rankings. In 2011, Forbes magazine published that Ghana was ranked the eleventh most friendly country in the world. The assertion was based on a survey in 2010 of a cross-section of travellers. Of all the African countries that were included in the survey, Ghana ranked highest. Tourism is the fourth highest earner of foreign exchange for the country. In 2017, Ghana ranked as the 43rd–most peaceful country in the world.

A growing tourist attraction is surfing. Up and down the coastline, several spots have been identified and cultivated by locals and internationals alike. Renowned surfers have made trips to the country to sample the waves. Suitable for beginners and seasoned surfers alike, there is a quality and consistency to the waves to suit all levels of skill. It is not unusual now to see surfers carrying their boards amid traditional Ghanaian fishing vessels. Busua, Kokrobite, and Muuston boast some of the country's best surf in warm, tropical waters.

According to Destination Pride–a data-driven search platform used to visualize the world's LGBTQ+ laws, rights and social sentiment–Ghana's Pride score is 22 (out of 100).

Education

Ghana's education system is divided into three parts: basic education, secondary cycle, and tertiary education. "Basic education" lasts 11 years (ages 4‒15). It is divided into kindergarten (2 years), primary school (2 modules of 3 years) and junior high (3 years). Junior high school ends with the Basic Education Certificate Examination. Once certified, the pupil can proceed to the secondary cycle. Hence, the pupil has the choice between general education (offered by the senior high school) and vocational education (offered by the technical senior high school or the technical and vocational institutes). Senior high school lasts three years and leads to the West African Senior School Certificate Examination, which is a prerequisite for enrollment in a university bachelor's degree programme. Polytechnics are open to vocational students.

A bachelor's degree usually requires four years of study. It can be followed by a one- or two-year master's degree programme, which can be followed by a PhD programme of at least three years. A polytechnic programme lasts two or three years. Ghana possesses numerous colleges of education. Some of the notable universities, the University of Ghana, Kwame Nkrumah University of Science and Technology, and University of Cape Coast, to mention a few.

With over 95% of its children in school, Ghana currently has one of the highest school enrollment rates in all of Africa. The female and male ages 15–24 years literacy rate in Ghana was 81% in 2010, with males at 82%, and females at 80%. Ghana's education system annually attracts many foreign students particularly in the university sector.

Ghana has a free education 6-year primary school education system beginning at age six. The government largely funds basic education comprising public primary schools and public junior high schools. Senior high schools were subsidised by the government until September 2017/2018 academic year that senior high education became free. At the higher education level, the government funds more than 80% of resources provided to public universities, polytechnics and teacher training colleges. As part of the Free Compulsory Universal Basic Education, Fcube, the government supplies all basic education schools with all their textbooks and other educational supplies, like exercise books. Senior high schools are also provided with all their textbook requirements by the government. Private schools acquire their educational material from private suppliers.

Demographics

As of 2019, Ghana has a population of 30,083,000. Around 29% of the population is under the age of 15, while persons aged 15–64 make up 57.8 percent of the population. The 2010 census reported that the largest ethnic groups are the Akan (47.3%), the Mole-Dagbani (16.6%), the Ewe (13.9%), the Ga-Dangme (7.4%), the Gurma (5.7%) and the Guan (3.7%). 
The median age of Ghanaian citizens is 30 years old and the average household size is 3.6 persons.

With recent legal immigration of skilled workers who possess Ghana Cards, there is a small population of Chinese, Malaysian, Indian, Middle Eastern and European nationals. In 2010, the Ghana Immigration Service reported many economic migrants and Illegal immigrants inhabiting Ghana: 14.6% (or 3.1 million) of Ghana's 2010 population (predominantly Nigerians, Burkinabe citizens, Togolese citizens, and Malian citizens). In 1969, under the "Ghana Aliens Compliance Order" enacted by the Prime Minister Kofi Abrefa Busia; The Border Guard Unit deported over 3,000,000 aliens and illegal immigrants in three months as they made up 20% of the population at the time. In 2013, there was a mass deportation of illegal miners, more than 4,000 of them Chinese nationals.

Languages

English is the official language of Ghana. Additionally, there are eleven languages that have the status of government-sponsored languages:
 Akan languages (Asante Twi, Akuapem Twi, Fante which have a high degree of mutual intelligibility, and Nzema, which is less intelligible with the above)
 Dangme
 Ewe
 Ga
 Guan
 Kasem
 Mole-Dagbani languages (Dagaare and Dagbanli)

Of these, Asante Twi is the most widely spoken.

Because Ghana is surrounded by French-speaking countries, French is widely taught in schools and used for commercial and international economic exchanges. Since 2006, Ghana has been an associate member of the Organisation internationale de la Francophonie, the global organisation that unites French-speaking countries (84 nations on six continents). In 2005, more than 350,000 Ghanaian children studied French in schools. Since then, its status has been progressively updated to a mandatory language in every junior high school, and it is in the process of becoming an official language.

Ghanaian Pidgin English, also known as Kru English (or in Akan, kroo brofo), is a variety of West African Pidgin English spoken mainly in Accra and in the southern towns. It can be divided into two varieties, referred to as "uneducated" or "non-institutionalized" pidgin and "educated" or "institutionalized" pidgin, the former associated with uneducated or illiterate people and the latter acquired and used in institutions such as universities.

Religion

In 2010, the population was 72.2% Christian (24.3% Pentecostal, 18.4% Protestant, 13.1% Catholic and 11.4% other). Approximately 18.6% of the population of Ghana are Muslim, (51% Sunni, 16% Ahmadiyya, and 8% Shia). Hinduism in Ghana was popularized by Swami Ghana Nanda ji, who opened several temples in the nation. The temple of Lord Shiva in Accra is one of the largest where there are celebrations to Ganesh Chaturthi, Rath Yatra, and other Hindu observations. The Bahá’í religious community, established in Ghana in 1951, today includes more than 100 communities and over 50 local Bahá’í administrative councils, called Local Spiritual Assemblies.

Universal health care and life expectancy 

Ghana has a universal health care system strictly designated for Ghanaian nationals, National Health Insurance Scheme (NHIS). Health care is variable throughout Ghana and in 2012, over 12 million Ghanaian nationals were covered by the NHIS. Urban centres are well served and contain most of the hospitals, clinics, and pharmacies. There are over 200 hospitals, and Ghana is a destination for medical tourism. In 2020, the WHO announced Ghana became the second country in the WHO African Region to attain regulatory system "maturity level 3", the second-highest in the four-tiered WHO classification of National medicines regulatory systems.

Life expectancy at birth in 2020 was 71 for a female and 65 for a male. In 2013, infant mortality was to 39 per 1,000 live births. Sources vary on life expectancy at birth; the World Health Organization (WHO) estimated 62 years for men and 64 years for women born in 2016. The fertility rate declined from 3.99 (2000) to 3.28 (2010) with 2.78 in urban region and 3.94 in rural region. The United Nations reports a fertility decline from 6.95 (1970) to 4.82 (2000) to 3.93 live births per woman in 2017.

, the HIV/AIDS prevalence was estimated at 1.40% among adults aged 15–49.

Culture

Food and drink
Ghanaian cuisine includes an assortment of soups and stews with varied seafoods; most Ghanaian soups are prepared with vegetables, meat, poultry or fish. Fish is important in the diet with tilapia, roasted and fried whitebait, smoked fish and crayfish, all being common components of Ghanaian dishes. Banku (akple) is a common starchy food made from ground corn (maize), and cornmeal based staples kɔmi (kenkey) and banku (akple) are usually accompanied by some form of fried fish (chinam) or grilled tilapia and a very spicy condiment made from raw red and green chillies, onions and tomatoes (pepper sauce). Banku and tilapia is a combo served in most restaurants. Fufu is the most common exported Ghanaian dish and is a delicacy across the African diaspora. Rice is an established staple meal across the country, with various rice based dishes serving as breakfast, lunch and dinner, the main variants are waakye, plain rice and stew (eight kontomire or tomato gravy), fried rice and jollof rice.

Literature

Clothing 

During the 13th century, Ghanaians developed their unique art of adinkra printing. Hand-printed and hand-embroidered adinkra clothes were made and used exclusively by royalty for devotional ceremonies. Each of the motifs that make up the corpus of adinkra symbolism has a name and meaning derived from a proverb, a historical event, human attitude, ethology, plant life-form, or shapes of inanimate and man-made objects. The meanings of the motifs may be categorised into aesthetics, ethics, human relations, and concepts. The Adinkra symbols have a decorative function as tattoos but also represent objects that encapsulate evocative messages that convey traditional wisdom, aspects of life, or the environment. There are many symbols with distinct meanings, often linked with proverbs. In the words of Anthony Appiah, they were one of the means in a pre-literate society for "supporting the transmission of a complex and nuanced body of practice and belief".
Along with the adinkra cloth, Ghanaians use many cloth fabrics for their traditional attire. The different ethnic groups have their own individual cloth. The most well known is the Kente cloth. Kente is a very important national costume and clothing, and these clothes are used to make traditional and modern Kente attire. Different symbols and different colours mean different things. Kente is the most famous of all the Ghanaian clothes. Kente is a ceremonial cloth hand-woven on a horizontal treadle loom and strips measuring about 4 inches wide are sewn together into larger pieces of cloths. Cloths come in various colours, sizes and designs and are worn during very important social and religious occasions. In a cultural context, kente is more important than just a cloth as it is a visual representation of history and also a form of written language through weaving. The term kente has its roots in the Akan word kɛntɛn which means a basket and the first kente weavers used raffia fibres to weave cloths that looked like kenten (a basket); and thus were referred to as kenten ntoma; meaning basket cloth. The original Akan name of the cloth was nsaduaso or nwontoma, meaning "a cloth hand-woven on a loom"; however, "kente" is the most frequently used term today.
Kente is also woven by the Ewe people (Ewe Kente) in the Volta Region. The main weaving centers are Agortime area and Agbozume. Agbozume has a vibrant kente market attracting patrons from all over west Africa and the diaspora.

Contemporary Ghanaian fashion includes traditional and modern styles and fabrics and has made its way into the African and global fashion scene. The cloth known as African print fabric was created out of Dutch wax textiles. It is believed that in the late 19th century, Dutch ships on their way to Asia stocked with machine-made textiles that mimicked Indonesian batik stopped at many West African ports on the way. The fabrics did not do well in Asia. However, in West Africa—mainly Ghana where there was an already established market for cloths and textiles—the client base grew and it was changed to include local and traditional designs, colours and patterns to cater to the taste of the new consumers. Today outside of Africa it is called "Ankara," and it has a client base well beyond Ghana and Africa as a whole. It is popular among Caribbean peoples and African Americans; celebrities such as Solange Knowles and her sister Beyoncé have been seen wearing African print attire. Many designers from countries in North America and Europe are now using African prints, and they have gained a global interest. British luxury fashion house Burberry created a collection around Ghanaian styles. American musician Gwen Stefani has repeatedly incorporated African prints into her clothing line and can often be seen wearing it. Internationally acclaimed Ghanaian-British designer Ozwald Boateng introduced African print suits in his 2012 collection.

Music and dance

The music of Ghana is diverse and varies between different ethnic groups and regions. Ghanaian music incorporates several distinct types of musical instruments such as the talking drum ensembles, Akan Drum, goje fiddle and koloko lute, court music, including the Akan Seperewa, the Akan atumpan, the Ga kpanlogo styles, and log xylophones used in asonko music. The most well-known genres to have come from Ghana are African jazz, which was created by Kofi Ghanaba, and its earliest form of secular music, called highlife. Highlife originated in the late 19th century and early 20th century and spread throughout West Africa.

In the 1990s, a new genre of music was created by the youth incorporating the influences of highlife, Afro-reggae, dancehall and hip hop. This hybrid was called hiplife. Ghanaian artists such as "Afro Roots" singer, activist and songwriter Rocky Dawuni, R&B and soul singer Rhian Benson and Sarkodie have had international success. In 2015, Rocky Dawuni became the first Ghanaian musician to be nominated for a Grammy award in the Grammy Award for Best Reggae Album category for his sixth studio album, titled Branches of The Same Tree.

Ghanaian dance is as diverse as its music, and there are traditional dances and different dances for different occasions. The most known dances are those for celebrations. These dances include the Adowa, Kpanlogo, Azonto, Klama, Agbadza, Borborbor and Bamaya. The Nana Otafrija Pallbearing Services, also known as the Dancing Pallbearers, come from the coastal town of Prampram. The group was featured in a BBC feature story in 2017, and footage from the story became part of an Internet meme in the wake of the COVID-19 world pandemic.

Film

Ghana has a budding and thriving film industry. Ghana's film industry dates as far back as 1948 when the Gold Coast Film Unit was set up in the Information Services Department. Some internationally recognised films have come from Ghana. In 1970, I Told You So was one of the first Ghanaian films to receive international acknowledgement and received great reviews from The New York Times. It was followed by the 1973 Ghanaian and Italian production The African Deal also known as "Contratto carnale" featuring Bahamian American actor Calvin Lockhart. 1983's Kukurantumi: the Road to Accra, a Ghanaian and German production directed by King Ampaw, was written about by famous American film critic Vincent Canby. In 1987, Cobra Verde, another Ghanaian and German production directed by Werner Herzog, received international acclamation and in 1988, Heritage Africa won more than 12 film awards.

In recent times, there have been collaborations between Ghanaian and Nigerian crew and cast and a number of productions turned out. Many Ghanaian films are co-produced with Nollywood, the Nigerian film industry, and some are distributed by Nigerian marketers. Also, Nigerian filmmakers often feature Ghanaian actors and actresses in their movies, and Ghanaian filmmakers feature Nigerian actors and actresses in theirs. Nadia Buari, Yvonne Nelson, Lydia Forson and Jackie Appiah, all popular Ghanaian actresses, and Van Vicker and Majid Michel are popular Ghanaian actors, have starred in many Nigerian movies. As a result of these collaborations, Western viewers often confuse Ghanaian movies with Nollywood and count their sales as one; however, they are two independent industries that sometimes share Nollywood. In 2009, UNESCO described Nollywood as the second-biggest film industry in the world after Bollywood. Though The film industry had a downtrend for almost a decade mainly because of low input in production this scenario has drastically changed. New and emerging young film makers are adding spice to the already rich Ghana movie scene. Bliz Bazawule, Peter Sedufia, Joseph Clef and many others have shown the world the new age of filming in Ghana.

Media

The media of Ghana are amongst the most free in Africa. Chapter 12 of the 1992 Constitution of Ghana guarantees freedom of the press and independence of the media, while Chapter 2 prohibits censorship. Post-independence, the government and media often had a tense relationship, with private outlets closed during the military governments and strict media laws that prevented criticism of government. Press freedoms were restored in 1992, and after the election in 2000 of Kufuor, the tensions between the private media and government decreased. Kufuor supported press freedom and repealed a libel law, but maintained that the media had to act responsibly. The Ghanaian media have been described as "one of the most unfettered" in Africa, operating with little restriction. The private press often carries criticism of government policy.

Sports

Association football is the top spectator sport in Ghana, and the national men's football team is known as the Black Stars, with the under-20 team known as the Black Satellites. Ghana has won the Africa Cup of Nations four times, the FIFA U-20 World Cup once, and has participated in three consecutive FIFA World Cups in 2006, 2010, and 2014. In the 2010 FIFA World Cup, Ghana became the third African country to reach the quarter-final stage after Cameroon in 1990 and Senegal in 2002. Ghana is the first and only country on the Africa continent to be crowned FIFA U-20 World Cup Champions, and two-time runners up in 1993 and 2001. The Ghana national U-17 football team known as the Black Starlets are two-time FIFA U-17 World Cup champions in 1991 and 1995, two-time runners up in 1993 and 1997.

Ghanaian football teams Asante Kotoko SC and Accra Hearts of Oak SC are the 5th and 9th best football teams on the Africa continent and have won a total of five Africa continental association football and Confederation of African Football trophies; Asante Kotoko SC has been crowned two-time CAF Champions League winners in 1970, 1983 and five-time CAF Champions League runners up. Accra Hearts of Oak SC has been crowned 2000 CAF Champions League winner and two-time CAF Champions League runners up, 2001 CAF Super Cup champions and 2004 CAF Confederation Cup champions. The International Federation of Football History and Statistics crowned Asante Kotoko SC as the African club of the 20th century. There are several club football teams that play in the Ghana Premier League and Division One League, both administered by the Ghana Football Association.

Ghana competed in the Winter Olympics in 2010 for the first time. Ghana qualified for the 2010 Winter Olympics, scoring 137.5 International Ski Federation points, within the qualifying range of 120–140 points. Skier Kwame Nkrumah-Acheampong became the first Ghanaian to take part in the Winter Olympics, taking part in the slalom skiing. Ghana finished 47th out of 102 participating nations, of whom 54 finished in the Alpine skiing slalom. Ghana's last medal at the Summer Olympics dates back to 1992. Ghanaian athletes have won a total of four medals in thirteen appearances at the Summer Olympics, three in boxing, and a bronze medal in association football, and thus became the first country on the Africa continent to win a medal at association football.

Ghana competes in the Commonwealth Games, sending athletes in every edition since 1954 (except for the 1986 games). Ghana has won 57 medals at the Commonwealth Games, including 15 gold, with all but one of their medals coming in athletics and boxing. The country has also produced a number of world class boxers, including Azumah Nelson a three-time world champion and considered as Africa's greatest boxer, Nana Yaw Konadu also a three-time world champion, Ike Quartey, and Joshua Clottey.

Ghana's women's football team won a bronze at the Africa Women Cup of Nations 2016 edition in Yaoundé, Cameroon. The team beat South Africa 1–0. Ghana featured a men's national team in beach volleyball that competed at the 2018–2020 CAVB Beach Volleyball Continental Cup. Ghana is to host the 2023 African Games in Accra.

Cultural heritage and architecture

There are two types of Ghanaian traditional construction: the series of adjacent buildings in an enclosure around a common, and the traditional round huts with grass roof. The round huts with grass roof architecture are situated in the northern regions, while the series of adjacent buildings are in the southern regions. Ghanaian postmodern architecture and high-tech architecture buildings are predominant in the southern regions, while heritage sites are most evident in the more than thirty forts and castles in the country, such as Fort William and Fort Amsterdam. Ghana has museums that are situated inside castles, and two are situated inside a fort. The Military Museum and the National Museum organise temporary exhibitions.

Ghana has museums that show an in-depth look at specific regions. There are a number of museums that provide insight into the traditions and history of the geographical areas. The Cape Coast Castle Museum and St. Georges Castle (Elmina Castle) Museum offer guided tours. The Museum of Science and Technology provides its visitors with a look into the domain of Ghanaian scientific development, through exhibits of objects of scientific and technological interest.

National symbols

The coat of arms depicts two animals: the tawny eagle and the lion; a ceremonial sword; a heraldic castle on a heraldic sea; a cocoa tree and a mine shaft representing the industrial mineral wealth of Ghana; and a five-pointed black star rimmed with gold, representing the mineral gold wealth of Ghana and the lodestar of the Ghanaian people. It also has the legend Freedom and Justice.

The flag of Ghana consists of three horizontal bands (strips) of red (top), gold (middle) and green (bottom); the three bands are the same height and width; the middle band bears a five-pointed black star in the centre of the gold band, the colour red band stands for the blood spilled to achieve the nation's independence: gold stands for Ghana's industrial mineral wealth, and the colour green symbolises the rich tropical rainforests and natural resources of Ghana.

See also

 Index of Ghana-related articles
 Outline of Ghana

References

279 Felix Kuadugah- contributor- Ewe migration

Further reading

 Arhin, Kwame, The Life and Work of Kwame Nkrumah (Africa Research & Publications, 1995)
 Babatope, Ebenezer, The Ghana Revolution: From Nkrumah to Jerry Rawlings (Fourth Dimension Publishing, 1982)
 Birmingham, David, Kwame Nkrumah: Father Of African Nationalism (Ohio University Press, 1998)
 Boafo-Arthur, Kwame, Ghana: One Decade of the Liberal State (Zed Books, 2007)
 Briggs, Philip, Ghana (Bradt Travel Guide) (Bradt Travel Guides, 2010)
 Clark, Gracia, African Market Women: Seven Life Stories from Ghana (Indiana University Press, 2010)
 Davidson, Basil, Black Star: A View of the Life and Times of Kwame Nkrumah (James Currey, 2007)
 Falola, Toyin, and Salm, Stephen J, Culture and Customs of Ghana (Greenwood, 2002)
 Grant, Richard, Globalizing City: The Urban and Economic Transformation of Accra, Ghana (Syracuse University Press, 2008)
 Hadjor, Kofi Buenor, Nkrumah and Ghana (Africa Research & Publications, 2003)
 Hasty, Jennifer, The Press and Political Culture in Ghana (Indiana University Press, 2005)
 James, C.L.R., Kwame Nkrumah and the Ghana Revolution (Allison & Busby, 1977)
 Kuada, John, and Chachah Yao, Ghana. Understanding the People and their Culture (Woeli Publishing Services, 1999)
 Miescher, Stephan F, Making Men in Ghana (Indiana University Press, 2005)
 Milne, June, Kwame Nkrumah, A Biography (Panaf Books, 2006)
 Nkrumah, Kwame, Ghana: The Autobiography of Kwame Nkrumah (International Publishers, 1971)
 Utley, Ian, Ghana – Culture Smart!: the essential guide to customs & culture (Kuperard, 2009)
 Various, Ghana: An African Portrait Revisited (Peter E. Randall Publisher, 2007)
 Younge, Paschal Yao, Music and Dance Traditions of Ghana: History, Performance and Teaching (Mcfarland & Co Inc., 2011)

External links

Government
 Ghana official website
 The Parliament of Ghana official site
 National Commission on Culture official site

General information
 Country Profile from BBC News
 Ghana from Encyclopædia Britannica
 Ghana from UCB Libraries GovPubs
 Ghana. The World Factbook. Central Intelligence Agency.
 Ghana profile from Africa.com
 
 
 The African Activist Archive Project website has photographs of the All Africa People's Conference held in Accra, Ghana, 5–13 December 1958 including Kwame Nkrumah, Prime Minister of Ghana, addressing the conference, the American Committee on Africa delegation meeting with Nkrumah, and of Patrick Duncan and Alfred Hutchinson of South Africa at the conference.
 Key Development Forecasts for Ghana from International Futures

Trade
 Ghana 2012 Summary Trade Statistics

 
Republics in the Commonwealth of Nations
Economic Community of West African States
English-speaking countries and territories
Member states of the African Union
Member states of the Commonwealth of Nations
Member states of the United Nations
States and territories established in 1957
West African countries
Articles containing video clips
1957 establishments in Ghana
Countries in Africa